Gary Butler is a former tight end who played in the National Football League.

Having played his college football with Rice University, Butler was drafted in the second round by the Kansas City Chiefs. He played two seasons in Kansas City before joining the Chicago Bears for 1975. After a year off of football he played for the Tampa Bay Buccaneers.

References

1951 births
Living people
American football tight ends
Rice Owls football players
Kansas City Chiefs players
Chicago Bears players
Tampa Bay Buccaneers players
Players of American football from Houston